Kondovo is a village in the municipality of Saraj, North Macedonia. Its FIPS code was MK90.

Demographics
According to the 1467-68 Ottoman defter, Kondovo appears as being inhabited by an Orthodox Albanian population. Some families had a mixed Slav-Albanian anthroponomy - usually a Slavic first name and an Albanian last name or last names with Albanian patronyms and Slavic suffixes. 

The names are: Stepan  son of Dushman, Don-ko son of Stepan, Gropan son of Stepan, Martin Proko, Preka Menko son of Martin.  

According to the 2021 census, the village had a total of 3.626 inhabitants. Ethnic groups in the village include:

Albanians 3.353
Turks 9
Macedonians 18
Serbs 2
Bosniaks 66
Others 178

See also
Kondovo Crisis

References

External links

Villages in Saraj Municipality
Albanian communities in North Macedonia